The Black Sea Fleet electoral district was a constituency created for the 1917 Russian Constituent Assembly election. The electoral district covered the military forces and employees and workers at bases under the command of the Black Sea Fleet.

Results

References

Electoral districts of the Russian Constituent Assembly election, 1917
1910s elections in Ukraine